Rhagodelbus bucharicus is a species of solifuge within the family Rhagodidae endemic to Uzbeckistan.

References 

Animals described in 1935
Endemic fauna of Uzbekistan
Solifugae